Glenroy Ricardo Sealy (born June 11, 1940) is a Barbadian-born Canadian cricketer. He played three One Day Internationals for Canada.

Career
Sealy was born in Saint Michael, Barbados on June 11, 1940, and at age 24 played a first-class match for the Barbados cricket team in February 1965 against the International Cavaliers. The right-handed batsman scored 10 runs without being dismissed and took one wicket with his medium pace at the cost of 20 runs.

Later, at the ages of 38 and 39, he played in all of Canada's games in the 1979 Cricket World Cup. Sequentially, Sealy played those three One Day Internationals against Pakistan, England, and Australia. Opening the batting, he scored 73 runs, including 45 (110) against Pakistan. In the same game, Sealy bowled for the only time in his international career, sending down 36 deliveries for 21 runs and no wicket.

References

1940 births
Canada One Day International cricketers
Canadian cricketers
Living people
Barbadian cricketers
Barbadian emigrants to Canada
Barbados cricketers